Leptospora is a genus of fungi in the class Dothideomycetes. The relationship of this taxon to other taxa within the class is unknown (incertae sedis).

Species 

Leptospora crinita
Leptospora decipiens
Leptospora dematium
Leptospora elaeodendri
Leptospora euphrasiae
Leptospora felina
Leptospora huebneri
Leptospora hyperici
Leptospora implexa
Leptospora indica
Leptospora inquinans
Leptospora jubaeae
Leptospora musae
Leptospora nuda
Leptospora palustris
Leptospora radiata
Leptospora rubella
Leptospora sparsa
Leptospora stictochaetophora

See also 
 List of Dothideomycetes genera incertae sedis

References

External links 
 Leptospora at Index Fungorum

Dothideomycetes enigmatic taxa
Dothideomycetes genera